All American Nightmare is the first single from the album of the same name by American rock band Hinder. It was released on September 14, 2010, on Universal Republic Records and became available for digital download on October 5.  It debuted on both the Active Rock and Mainstream Rock Songs charts at #30, and peaking on the Rock Songs chart at #22.

Music video
The music video for the song, where the band is not shown, features model Jesse Lee Denning as a "tattooed hellion within her own nightmare struggles."

References

2010 singles
2010 songs
Hinder songs
Songs written by the Warren Brothers
Songs written by Kevin Churko
Songs written by Marshal Dutton
Songs written by Cody Hanson
Songs written by Austin John Winkler
Song recordings produced by Kevin Churko
Universal Republic Records singles